The Cascadia Cup is the name of the trophy created in 2004 by supporters of the Portland Timbers, Seattle Sounders, and Vancouver Whitecaps, which is awarded each season to the best soccer team in the Pacific Northwest. The cup is named for the Cascadia region. The Timbers, Sounders, and Whitecaps have roots dating to the days of the original North American Soccer League. It was first contested in 2004, and was claimed by the Whitecaps. In 2011 the competition continued with the now Major League Soccer (MLS) sides Portland Timbers, Seattle Sounders FC, and Vancouver Whitecaps FC.

History 

In 2004, fan-based organizations supporting the Seattle Sounders, Portland Timbers and Vancouver Whitecaps sponsored the creation of a 2-foot-tall silver cup to be awarded annually to the club that finishes with the best record in the season series between the three rivals. From 2004 to 2006, the Cascadia Cup competition included all scheduled regular season A-League and later USL-1 matches played between the Sounders, Timbers, and Whitecaps.

In 2007, the Virginia Beach Mariners folded just before the season started, leaving the USL 1st Division to scramble to fix the season schedule. The result was an unbalanced schedule, and as such it was decided to adjust the Cascadia Cup format for that season. Fans of all three Cascadian teams agreed to make only the last home and last away matches between constituent clubs count toward the Cup.

In 2008 the clubs reverted to playing each other an equal three times each. The Cascadia Cup competition once again included all scheduled regular season USL-1 matches played between the three rivals.

The Seattle Sounders of the USL-1 were made defunct in 2009 due to the introduction of the MLS expansion franchise of the same name. In 2009, it was announced that expansion teams would be allotted to Vancouver and Portland. Both teams were named after their predecessors, ensuring the continuation of the rivalry. Supporters of the Timbers and Whitecaps decided to continue the Cascadia Cup without the Sounders for two years while playing in the USL. In 2009, supporters of the Timbers and Whitecaps only included regular season USL-1 matches played between the teams and Portland won the cup for the first time. Some Sounders supporters wished to include a preseason victory over Vancouver and a US Open Cup match win at Portland for consideration in the cup standings while others believed that the Cascadia Cup competition should be suspended until 2011. Portland won the Cup for a second consecutive year in 2010.

The 2011 MLS season marked the first season since 2008 in which all three teams would be in the same league. Seattle claimed their third title by going undefeated in Cascadia Cup play – coming from behind to win both of their road games in Portland and Vancouver while earning draws at home.

For the 2012 MLS season the league changed to an unbalanced schedule. As a result, each team would play the other two Cascadia club three times each. Portland had four games at home while Vancouver and Seattle had three and two, respectively. It was decided by the supporters groups to count all matches equally. Portland won the cup in Vancouver on October 21, 2012, with their only away win of their 2012 season. It was the Timbers' third time hoisting the cup, and the first with the Sounders in the competition.

For seven straight finals between 2015 and 2021, the Western Conference representative in the MLS Cup or the MLS is Back Tournament was from Cascadia. 

The Cascadia Cup Council decided that 2020 matches not played in front of supporters, including the MLS is Back Tournament, would not count towards Cascadia Cup standings.

Trademark dispute 

In December 2012, MLS filed a trademark claim for rights to the name "Cascadia Cup". This caused an immediate reaction from the three main supporters groups—the Timbers Army, Emerald City Supporters, and the Vancouver Southsiders—that had created the original competition. This prompted them to form a legal entity called the Cascadia Cup Council, whose sole purpose was to obtain and retain the legal rights to the name "Cascadia Cup". Releases by MLS indicate that their trademark plan was an altruistic attempt to protect the Cascadia Cup from abuse by third parties, a claim that was disputed by the contest-organizing fan groups. Those same groups later had discussions with MLS leadership in an attempt to resolve the issue, and in July 2013 both MLS and the supporters groups announced an agreement that the council would own the trademark and no monetization would occur without the agreement of all parties.

Scoring 

In most years since all three teams have been in MLS (2011–present), all of the games between the Cascadia teams count in Cascadia Cup standings. In some years, however, some of the matchups are uneven, with more games between some pairs of teams than others. In 2018, for instance, the Timbers-Sounders matchup was played three times but the Whitecaps played the other two teams only twice each. To keep the Cup competition balanced in these years, only a subset of games count toward the Cup standings, with the supporters groups agreeing before the season which games to count. In 2018, for instance, the final two games of each matchup were the ones that counted, and the initial Timbers-Sounders game on May 13 was excluded.

The winner each year is decided by these criteria, in order:

 Greater number of points in all Cascadia Cup matches.
 Greater number of points earned in matches between teams tied on points.
 Greater goal difference in matches between teams tied on points.
 Greater number of goals scored in matches between teams tied on points.
 Reapply previous three criteria if two or more teams are still tied.
 Greater goal difference in all Cascadia Cup matches.
 Greater number of goals scored in all Cascadia Cup matches.
 Smaller number of disciplinary points in all Cascadia Cup matches (yellow = 1 point, red = 2 points).

Title performance

Titles won

Annual results

Western Conference standings finishes

• Total: Seattle with 8 highest finishes, Portland with 3, Vancouver with 1. Finishes with an asterisk (*) indicate winning the Cascadia Cup.
• Border indicates playoff line.

Season by season breakdown

USL era

USL/MLS split (Seattle ineligible)

Major League Soccer era

No 2020 winner awarded due to COVID-19 pandemic

2023 season

See also 

 Portland Timbers–Seattle Sounders rivalry
 Portland Timbers–Vancouver Whitecaps rivalry
 Seattle Sounders–Vancouver Whitecaps rivalry
 MLS rivalry cups

References

External links
 

Major League Soccer rivalries
Portland Timbers
Seattle Sounders (1994–2008)
Seattle Sounders FC
Soccer cup competitions in Canada
Soccer rivalries in Canada
Soccer cup competitions in the United States
Soccer in British Columbia
Soccer in Oregon
Soccer in Seattle
Sports in Portland, Oregon
Vancouver Whitecaps
2004 establishments in North America
Recurring sporting events established in 2004
Association football friendly trophies